Valaichenai Hindu College, Batticaloa, was established in 1926, by Mr.Costhappa Kandaiya. Valaichenai Hindu  College is a Navodaya School, which provides primary and secondary education. The school has a student population exceeding 1800 across 13 grades from primary to secondary classes. The school resides in Valaichenai. The academic staff of more than 70 is led by Principal Mr. A Jeyajeevan.

References 

Educational institutions established in 1926
Provincial schools in Sri Lanka
Schools in Batticaloa District
1926 establishments in Ceylon